Scott D. Pomfret is a securities lawyer based in Boston, Massachusetts.  Pomfret currently serves as Regulatory Counsel at a private investment firm, where he is responsible for legal and regulatory compliance, including  with the rules and regulations of the SEC, CFTC, NFA, Department of Labor, and other domestic and foreign regulators. Previously, Pomfret was the Director of PricewaterhouseCooper’s  Financial Services Regulatory Practice, where he conducted compliance reviews of U.S. and U.K. advisers to hedge, real estate, and private equity funds, as well as mutual fund complexes and insurance company asset management affiliates.

From 2003 to 2010, Pomfret was a branch chief in the Division of Enforcement of the Securities and Exchange Commission’s Boston office. He has led investigations of market timing, stock options backdating, financial fraud, insider trading, and investment advisor and hedge fund fraud. His trials include a stint as a Special Assistant United States Attorney in the District of Massachusetts in a successful perjury trial against a former general counsel of a public company and a three-week market manipulation trial against three former brokers.  In 2007 and 2008, Pomfret won the Division Director’s Award. Pomfret was a member of the SEC's Hedge Fund Working Group and was appointed the first co-chair of an affinity group for GLBT employees and helped inaugurate the SEC’s first gay pride celebration in 2008.

Pomfret is the author of numerous articles in legal journals and speaks regularly about regulatory issues for alternative and traditional asset managers.  He is the author of Since My Last Confession: A Gay Catholic Memoir and a frequent commenter on issues involving gay Catholics and gay publishing.  He also co-authored the Q-Guide to Wine and Cocktails and numerous works of fiction and non-fiction.

Prior to SEC, Pomfret was a litigation associate at Ropes & Gray LLP in Boston, where he specialized in government enforcement work in securities and health care fraud.  Among the notable matters on which Pomfret worked was a pro bono case challenging the constitutionality of Massachusetts sodomy statutes.  Pomfret clerked on the United States Court of Appeals for the First Circuit for the Honorable Norman Stahl, and is a graduate of the University of Michigan Law School.

Notes

Living people
American lawyers
American gay writers
University of Michigan Law School alumni
American Roman Catholics
LGBT Roman Catholics
People associated with Ropes & Gray
Year of birth missing (living people)